Nehru Memorial College, Puthanampatti is an Autonomous college affiliated to Bharathidasan University in Puthanampatti, Trichy, Tamil Nadu. The college is recognized by the University Grants Commission (India) under Sec 2(f) and 12(B) of the UGC Act, 1956.

The college offers numerous Undergraduate, Postgraduate courses besides Research & doctoral Studies in various disciplines with a special focus on Information Technology

The college is a trendsetter in introducing B.Sc Computer Science in the Arts and Science Colleges at national level as early as 1983 along with St.Joseph College, Trichy.

The first institution to introduce Data Science programs in the Bharathidasan University affiliated colleges during the academic year 2017-2018.

History
The College was established in 1967 by the Philanthropist Shri M. Mooka Pillai and Inaugurated by the Chief Minister at the time of Tamil Nadu, Dr. C.N. Annadurai.

Departments
NMC Puthanampatti has 15 departments.
 Tamil
 Biotechnology
 Botany
 Business Administration
 Chemistry
 Commerce
 Computer Science
 Data Science
 Economics
 English
 Hotel Management
 Mathematics
 Physics
 Zoology
 Embedded Systems

Innovative Programme
University Grants Commission has approved two year Post Graduate Degree Programme M.Sc Embedded Systems from the academic year 2012-2013.
The University Grants Commission sanctioned Rs 43.5 lakhs towards strengthening Laboratory Facilities.

Events

NAAC Peer Team visited the college on 12–14 September 2012 for accreditation

Physical Facilities and Infrastructure
 Land and Building   
   Land Area (in Acres)                             35 Acres 75 cent  
   Built up Area                                    22390.87 Sqmt  
   Play ground / Sports / Games Area                15 Acres      
 
Teaching / Learning  
   Number of Class Rooms                           69 
   Number of Tutorial Rooms                        67 
   Number of Laboratories                          09 
   Number of Seminar Rooms                         02 
   Number of Conference Rooms                      02 
   Number of Committee Rooms                       01    
 
Hostel Facilities 
   Number of Seats in Boys Hostel                  600 
   Number of Seats in Girls Hostel                 1500      
 
Library 
   Seating Capacity of Library Reading Room        72 + 15  
   Number of Books in the Library                  31500 
   Number of Journals Subscribed                   72 
   Number of Multimedia Literature                 05     
 
ICT Infrastructure  
   Number of PCs in Computer Centre                350 
   Number of PIV or higher OCs                     5 Servers  
   Number of LAN Terminals                         350 
   Wi-fi Connectivity                              Yes 
   Type and Speed of Internet Connectivity         8Mbit/s

Location
The college is situated around 30 km from Trichy and 15 km from Thuraiyur.
The very nearest domestic airport and the Railway Junction is located at Trichy and the International airport is located at trichy about 45 km from Puthanampatti.

References

External links 

 

Monuments and memorials to Jawaharlal Nehru
Education in Tiruchirappalli district
Educational institutions established in 1967
1967 establishments in Madras State
Colleges affiliated to Bharathidasan University